There are results from Russian Basketball Super League A 2007–08.

Regular season

October
(All times given below are in local)

Standings after October

November

Standings after November

December

Standings after December

January

Standings after January

February

Standings after February

March

Standings after March

April

Standings after April

results